The Blood Ship is a 1927 silent drama film directed by George B. Seitz and starring Hobart Bosworth, Jacqueline Logan and Richard Arlen. It is based on the 1922 novel The Blood Ship by Norman Springer, later remade by Seitz as the 1931 sound film Shanghaied Love.

Plot
A disgraced sea captain signs on as a hand on a cargo ship, which turns out to be captained by the tyrannical man who ruined his reputation. The other crewmen have mostly been shanghaied aboard and are kept in line by the captain and his brutal first mate. The former captain begins to plot a mutiny to take control of the ship from their brutal regime.

Cast
 Hobart Bosworth as Jim Newman
 Jacqueline Logan as Mary Swope Newman
 Richard Arlen as John Shreve
 Walter James as Capt. Angus Swope
 Fred Kohler as First Mate Fitz
 James Bradbury Sr. as The Knitting Swede
 Arthur Rankin as Nils
 Syd Crossley as Cockney Bouncer
 Frank Hemphill as Second Mate
 Chappell Dossett as Rev. Richard Deaken
 Blue Washington as Negro

Preservation status
The seventh and final reel of the film was thought to be lost until 2007.  The final reel was ultimately found and the film was screened in its entirety on October 11, 2007. The Blood Ship was preserved by the Academy Film Archive, in conjunction with Sony Pictures, in 2007.

References

Bibliography
 Goble, Alan. The Complete Index to Literary Sources in Film. Walter de Gruyter, 1999.

External links

1927 films
1927 drama films
American silent feature films
American black-and-white films
Silent American drama films
Columbia Pictures films
Films directed by George B. Seitz
1920s American films